Manindra Mohan Shrivastava is an Indian Judge. He is the current Acting Chief Justice of the Rajasthan High Court. He has served in the post Acting Chief Justice of Rajasthan High in the past, in 2022. He is also a former Judge of the Chhattisgarh High Court.

References

Indian judges
1964 births
Living people